The mountain shrike (Lanius validirostris) or grey-capped shrike, is a species of bird in the family Laniidae. It is endemic to the Philippines.

Its natural habitats are tropical moist montane forest and grassland. It is becoming rare due to habitat loss.

Description 
EBird describes the bird as "A medium-sized bird of montane clearings and shrubland. Has a typical shrike shape, with a long tail and hooked bill. Gray above with darker wings and tail, white underparts, orange sides, and a black mask through the eye. Some races have more orange on the underparts. Similar to Long-tailed Shrike, but usually occurs in more wooded areas at higher elevations, is slightly shorter-tailed, and lacks a white spot in the wing. Calls include a dry “chit!” note and a repeated grating alarm call, “krr-krr-krr-krr-krr!”

Subspecies 
Three subspecies are recognized:

 Lanius validirostris validirostris : Found on Luzon; Largest in size and white belly and breast 
 Lanius validirostris hachisuka : Found on Mindanao; Intermediate in size and rich rufous breast and belly 
 Lanius validirostris tertius : Found on Mindoro; Smallest in size and light rufous breast and belly

Habitat and Conservation Status 
It is found in montane secondary forest, forest edge, open woodland and grassland areas from 1,200 to 2,400 meters above sea level.  It appears to be limited to drier areas, and has been found in areas both with or without pine trees. Little else is known about this bird.

IUCN has assessed this bird as least concern with the population believe to be stable. Although it has a limited range, due to the relative security of its montane habitatm and its regular presence within its habitat it is not listed as threatened. 

There are currently no species targeted conservation programs . Conservation actions proposed include to surveys in areas within and surrounding the species's range to determine distribution and abundance, as well as assess population and habitat loss. Conduct ecological studies to improve understanding and tolerance to habitat degradation. Protect areas of habitat occupied by the species and safeguard against future threats.

References

mountain shrike
Endemic birds of the Philippines
mountain shrike
Taxonomy articles created by Polbot